The Bateson Lecture is an annual genetics lecture held as a part of the John Innes Symposium since 1972, in honour of the first Director of the John Innes Centre, William Bateson.

Past Lecturers
Source: John Innes Centre 
 1951 Sir Ronald Fisher - "Statistical methods in Genetics"
 1953 Julian Huxley - "Polymorphic variation: a problem in genetical natural history"
 1955 Sidney C. Harland - "Plant breeding: present position and future perspective"
 1957 J.B.S. Haldane - "The theory of evolution before and after Bateson"
 1959 Kenneth Mather - "Genetics Pure and Applied"
 1972 William Hayes - "Molecular genetics in retrospect"
 1974 Guido Pontecorvo - "Alternatives to sex: genetics by means of somatic cells"
 1976 Max F. Perutz - "Mechanism of respiratory haemoglobin"
 1979 J. Heslop-Harrison - "The forgotten generation: some thoughts on the genetics and physiology of Angiosperm Gametophytes "
 1982 Sydney Brenner - "Molecular genetics in prospect"
 1984 W.W. Franke - "The cytoskeleton - the insoluble architectural framework of the cell"
 1986 Arthur Kornberg - "Enzyme systems initiating replication at the origin of the E. coli chromosome"
 1988 Gottfried Schatz - "Interaction between mitochondria and the nucleus"
 1990 Christiane Nusslein-Volhard - "Axis determination in the Drosophila embryo"
 1992 Frank Stahl - "Genetic recombination: thinking about it in phage and fungi"
 1994 Ira Herskowitz - "Violins and orchestras: what a unicellular organism can do"
 1996 R.J.P. Williams - "An Introduction to Protein Machines"
 1999 Eugene Nester - "DNA and Protein Transfer from Bacteria to Eukaryotes - the Agrobacterium story"
 2001 David Botstein - "Extracting biological information from DNA Microarray Data"
 2002 Elliot Meyerowitz
 2003 Thomas Steitz - "The Macromolecular machines of gene expression"
 2008 Sean Carroll - "Endless flies most beautiful: the role of cis-regulatory sequences in the evolution of animal form"
 2009 Sir Paul Nurse - "Genetic transmission through the cell cycle"
 2010 Professor Joan Steitz, Yale University - Viral noncoding RNAs: master regulators of RNA decay
 2011 Professor Philip Benfey, Duke University - Development rooted in interwoven networks
 2013 Professor Ottoline Leyser, University of Cambridge - 'Shoot branching plasticity, how and why'
 2014 Professor Michael Eisen, University of California, Berkeley – ‘Embryonic adolescence: control of gene expression during early fly development’
 2015 Professor George Church, Harvard Medical School – ‘Outer limits of genetic technologies’
 2017 Professor Frederick M. Ausubel, Department of Molecular Biology, Massachusetts General Hospital – ‘Modelling Plant-Microbe Interactions’

See also

 List of genetics awards

References

Genetics awards
Genetics in the United Kingdom
Science and technology in Norfolk
Science lecture series